Zemplínske Hámre is a village and municipality in Snina District in the Prešov Region of north-eastern Slovakia.

History
The village was built in 1954.
Zemplínske Hámre is a village and municipality in Snina District in the Pre%u0161ov Region of north-eastern Slovakia.

Geography
The municipality lies at an altitude of 346 metres and covers an area of 8.448 km². According to the 2013 census it had a population of 1264 inhabitants.

External links
 
 
https://web.archive.org/web/20070513023228/http://www.statistics.sk/mosmis/eng/run.html

Notes 

Villages and municipalities in Snina District